Earl of Winchilsea is a title in the Peerage of England. It has been held by the Finch-Hatton family of Kent, and united with the title of Earl of Nottingham under a single holder since 1729. 

The Finch family is believed to be descended from Henry FitzHerbert, Lord Chamberlain to Henry I (r. 1100–1135).
The name change to Finch came in the 1350s after marriage to an heiress of the Finch family.
The Herbert family of Wales, Earls of Pembroke, share common ancestry but bear differenced arms.

A later member of the family, Sir William Finch, was knighted in 1513.
His son Sir Thomas Finch (died 1563), was also knighted for his share in suppressing Sir Thomas Wyatt's insurrection against Queen Mary I, and was the son-in-law of Sir Thomas Moyle, some of whose lands Finch's wife inherited.
Thomas's eldest son Moyle Finch represented Weymouth, Kent and Winchelsea in the House of Commons.
In 1611 he was created a baronet, of Eastwell in the County of Kent.

In 1660 the 3rd Earl of Winchilsea was created Baron FitzHerbert of Eastwell, Kent, in recompense for his efficient aid in the Restoration of the Monarchy.

History
Sir Moyle Finch, 1st Baronet of Eastwell, married Elizabeth Heneage, only daughter of Sir Thomas Heneage (1532–1595), Vice-Chamberlain of the Household to Queen Elizabeth I.
After Sir Moyle's death in 1614, Elizabeth and her sons made considerable efforts to have the family's status elevated.
On 8 July 1623, Elizabeth was raised to the Peerage of England as Viscountess Maidstone, and on 12 July 1628 she was further honoured when she was made Countess of Winchilsea.
Lady Winchilsea and Sir Moyle Finch's youngest son, the Hon. Sir Heneage Finch, served as Speaker of the House of Commons and was the father of Heneage Finch, who was created Earl of Nottingham in 1681.

Sir Moyle Finch was succeeded in the baronetcy by his eldest son Theophilus, the 2nd Baronet (1573–1619).
He sat as Member of Parliament for Great Yarmouth but died childless circa 1619.
He was succeeded by his younger brother Thomas, the 3rd Baronet.
He represented Winchelsea and Kent in the House of Commons.
In 1634, he also succeeded his mother as the second Earl of Winchilsea.

The third Earl, son of the second, supported the Restoration in 1660 and was thanked for his efforts the same year when he was created Baron FitzHerbert of Eastwell, in the County of Kent, in the Peerage of England.

The third earl's eldest son, William Finch, Viscount Maidstone, predeceased his father, but his son Charles succeeded as fourth Earl.
He served as President of the Board of Trade and as Lord Lieutenant of Kent.
His wife Anne Finch, Countess of Winchilsea, was a well-known poet.

The fourth Earl had no children and the titles passed to his uncle, Heneage Finch, 5th Earl of Winchilsea.
He had earlier represented Hythe in Parliament.

The fifth Earl was also childless and was succeeded by his half-brother, John Finch, 6th Earl of Winchilsea.
He never married, and on his death in 1729 the Barony of FitzHerbert of Eastwell became extinct.

The remaining titles passed to a cousin, Daniel Finch, 2nd Earl of Nottingham, who became the seventh Earl of Winchilsea as well (see below for earlier history of this branch of the family).
He was a noted statesman and served as First Lord of the Admiralty, Secretary of State for the Southern Department, Secretary of State for the Northern Department and as Lord President of the Council.

His son the 8th Earl of Winchilsea was also a politician and held office as First Lord of the Admiralty and as Lord President of the Council. 

The eighth Earl was childless and was succeeded by his nephew, the 9th Earl, son of the Hon. William Finch, second son of the 2nd Earl of Nottingham.
The 9th Earl was Lord Lieutenant of Rutland for many years and was also an influential figure in the history of cricket.

He died unmarried and was succeeded by his first cousin once removed, the 10th Earl, son of George Finch-Hatton (1747–1823) (who had assumed the additional surname of Hatton), son of the Hon. Edward Finch, fifth son of the 2nd Earl of Nottingham, and his wife the Hon. Anne Hatton, who was the daughter of Christopher Hatton, 1st Viscount Hatton (see the Viscount Hatton) and a relation of the famous Sir Christopher Hatton.
The 10th Earl is famous for his duel with the Duke of Wellington, who was Prime Minister at the time.
The duel, which was over the issue of Catholic emancipation and related to insulting remarks made by the Earl, took place at Battersea Fields on 21 March 1829.
Both men deliberately aimed wide and Winchilsea apologised.

His son the 11th Earl had represented Northamptonshire North in Parliament as a Tory.
He died without surviving male issue and was succeeded by his half-brother, the 12th Earl, who had sat briefly as Conservative Member of Parliament for Lincolnshire South and for Spalding.
He was succeeded by his younger brother, the 13th Earl. , the titles are held by his great-great-grandson, the 17th Earl of Winchilsea and 12th Earl of Nottingham (the title having descended from father to son), who succeeded in 1999.

The Hon. Sir Heneage Finch was the third and youngest son of Sir Moyle Finch and the Countess of Winchilsea. He served as Speaker of the House of Commons from 1625 to 1628. His son Heneage Finch, 1st Earl of Nottingham, was a prominent lawyer and politician and served as Lord Chancellor of England from 1675 to 1682.
He was created a baronet, of Raunston in the County of Buckingham, in the Baronetage of England in 1660 and in 1673 he was raised to the Peerage of England as Baron Finch of Daventry in the County of Northampton.
In 1681, he was further honoured when he was made Earl of Nottingham, also in the Peerage of England.
He was succeeded by his son, Daniel Finch, 2nd Earl of Nottingham, who in 1729 succeeded his second cousin as the seventh Earl of Winchilsea. See above for further history of the titles.

Several other members of the Finch family have also gained distinction.
The Hon. Heneage Finch, second son of the 1st Earl of Nottingham, was made Earl of Aylesford in 1714.
The Hon. Edward Finch, the fifth son of the 1st Earl of Nottingham, was a composer and sat as Member of Parliament for Cambridge University.
He later took holy orders and served as Prebendary of York and Canterbury.
The Hon. Edward Finch, fifth son of the 2nd Earl of Nottingham, sat as Member of Parliament for Cambridge University from 1727 to 1768.
The Hon. Harold Heneage Finch-Hatton, fourth son of the 10th Earl, represented Newark in the House of Commons.
The Hon. Denys Finch Hatton, younger brother of the 14th Earl, moved to East Africa and became a noted pilot and hunter, and a close friend of Karen Blixen.
In the film Out of Africa he was played by Robert Redford.
John Finch, 1st Baron Finch of Fordwich, was the son of Sir Henry Finch, younger brother of Sir Moyle Finch, 1st Baronet of Eastwell.
George Finch, illegitimate son of the 9th Earl of Winchilsea, was a politician.
His son, George Finch, was Father of the House of Commons.

The earldom of 1628 is sometimes written Winchelsea, after the modern spelling of the town (and Cinque Port) in East Sussex.

Family seat and motto

The ancestral family seat was Burley on the Hill House, built by the 7th Earl of Winchilsea.
But the unmarried 9th Earl of Winchilsea sought and obtained an act of Parliament to break the entail of the estate, and left it to his illegitimate son, George Finch, rather than to his cousin the 10th Earl.

Eastwell Park became the new seat for the George William Finch-Hatton, 10th Earl of Winchilsea, 5th Earl of Nottingham.
Eastwell was built by his father George Finch-Hatton.
The Eastwell estate, near Ashford, Kent, was owned by the Earls of Winchilsea until the mid-1860s, when the 11th Earl had to leave the property due to financial difficulties; it was later occupied by The Prince Alfred, Duke of Edinburgh, the second son of Queen Victoria.

The Kirby Hall estate, near Corby, in Northamptonshire was inherited by George Finch Hatton, through his mother Anne Hatton.
The estate is still (2009) owned by the Earl of Winchilsea, although the palatial hall – now partially de-roofed – is no longer lived in by the family.
The hall itself and the adjacent gardens are today administered by English Heritage. 

The Finch family motto is Nil conscire sibi ("Conscious of no evil"), and the Hatton motto is Virtus tutissima cassis ("Virtue is the safest helmet").

Finch baronets, of Eastwell (1611)
Sir Moyle Finch, 1st Baronet (died 1614)
Sir Theophilus Finch, 2nd Baronet (c. 1573–c. 1619)
Sir Thomas Finch, 3rd Baronet (1578–1639) (succeeded as Earl of Winchilsea in 1634)

Earls of Winchilsea (1628) and Nottingham (1681)

Other titles (1st holder onwards): Viscount Maidstone (Eng 1623)
Other titles (3rd-6th Earls): Baron FitzHerbert of Eastwell (Eng 1660, extinct 1729)
Other titles (7th Earl onwards): Baron Finch of Daventry (Eng 1673)
Elizabeth Finch, 1st Countess of Winchilsea, 1st Viscountess Maidstone (1556–1634) 
Thomas Finch, 2nd Earl of Winchilsea, 2nd Viscount Maidstone (1578–1639)
Heneage Finch, 3rd Earl of Winchilsea, 3rd Viscount Maidstone, 1st Baron FitzHerbert of Eastwell (c. 1635–1689)
William Finch, Viscount Maidstone (1652–1672)
Charles Finch, 4th Earl of Winchilsea, 4th Viscount Maidstone, 2nd Baron FitzHerbert of Eastwell (1672–1712)
Heneage Finch, 5th Earl of Winchilsea, 5th Viscount Maidstone, 3rd Baron FitzHerbert of Eastwell (1657–1726)
John Finch, 6th Earl of Winchilsea, 6th Viscount Maidstone, 4th Baron FitzHerbert of Eastwell (1683–1729)
Daniel Finch, 7th Earl of Winchilsea, 2nd Earl of Nottingham (1647–1730)
Daniel Finch, 8th Earl of Winchilsea, 3rd Earl of Nottingham (c. 1709–1769)
George Finch, 9th Earl of Winchilsea, 4th Earl of Nottingham (1752–1826)
George William Finch-Hatton, 10th Earl of Winchilsea, 5th Earl of Nottingham (1791–1858)
George James Finch-Hatton, 11th Earl of Winchilsea, 6th Earl of Nottingham  (1815–1887)
George William Heneage Finch-Hatton, Viscount Maidstone (1852–1879)
Murray Edward Gordon Finch-Hatton, 12th Earl of Winchilsea, 7th Earl of Nottingham (1851–1898)
George Edward Henry Finch-Hatton, Viscount Maidstone (1882–1892)
Henry Stormont Finch-Hatton, 13th Earl of Winchilsea, 8th Earl of Nottingham  (1852–1927)
Guy Montagu George Finch-Hatton, 14th Earl of Winchilsea, 9th Earl of Nottingham (1885–1939)
Christopher Guy Heneage Finch-Hatton, 15th Earl of Winchilsea, 10th Earl of Nottingham (1911–1950)
Christopher Denys Stormont Finch-Hatton, 16th Earl of Winchilsea, 11th Earl of Nottingham (1936–1999)
Daniel James Hatfield Finch-Hatton, 17th Earl of Winchilsea, 12th Earl of Nottingham (born 1967)

The heir apparent is the present holder's elder son Tobias Joshua Stormont Finch-Hatton, Viscount Maidstone (born 1998).

Earls of Nottingham (1681)
Heneage Finch, 1st Earl of Nottingham (1621–1682)
Daniel Finch, 2nd Earl of Nottingham (1647–1730) (succeeded as Earl of Winchilsea in 1729)

See also
Earl of Aylesford
Baron Finch of Fordwich
Earl of Nottingham
Viscount Hatton

References

Kidd, Charles, Williamson, David (editors). Debrett's Peerage and Baronetage (1990 edition). New York: St Martin's Press, 1990.
Lord's 1787–1945 by Sir Pelham Warner 
Cricinfo page on the 9th Earl of Winchilsea (includes detailed article from The Cricketer)
History of Burley on the Hill, Rutland - Finch pedigree

External links

The Guardian newspaper report of 10th Earl's duel with the Duke of Wellington

 

Earldoms in the Peerage of England

1628 establishments in England
Noble titles created in 1628